The Fitzgibbon Cup is the trophy for the premier hurling championship among higher education institutions (universities, colleges and institutes of technology) in Ireland.

The Fitzgibbon Cup competition is administered by Comhairle Ard Oideachais Cumann Lúthchleas Gael (CLG), the GAA's Higher Education Council. Comhairle Ard Oideachais also oversees the Ryan Cup (tier 2 hurling championship), the Fergal Maher Cup (tier 3 hurling championship) and the Padraig MacDiarmada (tier 4 hurling championship).

The GAA Higher Education Cups are sponsored by Electric Ireland.

History 
[[File:Fitzgibbon Cup 1910's.jpg|thumb|350px|The Fitzgibbon Cup'' donated by The Rev Fr Edwin Fitzgibbon O.S.F.C. (Order of Saints Francis and Clare, a Franciscan religious order) for Inter-Collegiate Hurling competition. The silver cup was made by Messrs William Egan & Sons, silversmiths, Cork, Ireland in February 1912. It is 24 inches in height. A detachable lid was lost in 1973 and never replaced. Old Celtic tracing designs are engraved around the edges of the trophy. The handles have open-mouthed creatures, probably fish. The cup was mounted on a mahogany plinth to which plaques with the names of the winning teams were attached.]]
The cup is named after Dr. Edwin Fitzgibbon, a Capuchin friar and, from 1911 to 1936, who was Professor of Philosophy at University College Cork. In 1912 Dr. Fitzgibbon donated most of his annual salary to purchase the trophy. The cup was made at William Egan and Sons' silversmiths, Cork, and bears a large inscription on its front: The Fitzgibbon Cup, Donated by The Rev Fr Edwin O.S.F.C. Feb. 1912. It was a 24-inch-tall, large silver trophy, with a round base and a stem that narrowed and then expanded again in support of a wide spherical body, with Old Celtic tracing designs featuring around the edges. It had a circular, open head, on which was placed a detachable lid. The lid was lost on the night of the 1973 tournament final at Galway and has never been replaced.

The competition was played on a round-robin basis until 1949, when a straight knockout format was adopted. For the first 30 years, the cup was dominated by UCC and UCD, with UCG winning occasionally. Queen's University Belfast first took part in 1946, and won their only title in 1953. Each of the NUI Colleges had the cup withheld from them once: In 1933 UCC was awarded custody of the cup, but was not declared the formal winner, following a successful objection to three players on the UCD winning team; in 1940 the Cup was not awarded to any team, after UCC, which had won both its games, was deemed to have an irregular team; and in 1954 the cup was withheld from UCG and the tournament declared null and void after an investigation into the legality of the Galway team and violent scenes at the tournament.

The popularity of the championship grew, and, in the 60s and 70s three more colleges entered: Trinity College Dublin, UU Coleraine and NUI Maynooth. The eight-in-a-row sequence of victories recorded by UCC from 1981 to 1988 was the greatest in the history of the competition. In the late 1980s, all teams in Division One of the Higher Education League were admitted. In 1989 NIHE Limerick (now University of Limerick) became the first non-university Fitzgibbon Cup champions. Since 2001/02 Institutes of Technology have become top guns in the tournament. Waterford IT won the title four times and Limerick IT, the Cup twice in six years (2002/03 through 2007/08). In the remaining six years Cork IT, Limerick IT and Waterford IT have each been losing finalists twice. UCC are the leaders in the roll of honour with 38 titles, the last in 2013.

The first local derby final took place between Limerick Institute of Technology and the University of Limerick at the Gaelic Grounds, Limerick in March 2005; the same institutions met again in the final at Waterford in March 2011. The final in 2012 was a Cork local derby between Cork IT and UCC. The first Fitzgibbon final between Institutes of Technology, also a Munster derby match, took place in 2008 between Waterford IT and Limerick IT.

The Fitzgibbon Cup final was played in Limerick in 2014/15, hosted by Limerick Institute of Technology. The final, which brought together the University of Limerick and the 2014 champions Waterford Institute of Technology ended in a 3-13 to 0-21 draw at the Gaelic Grounds. In the replay at Páirc Úi Rinn in Cork, the University of Limerick emerged victorious, winning the Fitzgibbon Cup for the 5th time which UL last won in 2011.

Roll of honour
Colleges by wins
Two Fitzgibbon Cups tournament were not played (1920/21 and 1942/43), one tournament was declared null and void (1953/54), and in 1932/33 and 1939/40 the Cup and winners' medals were not awarded.

Finalists who have not won the Fitzgibbon Cup:
 Cork Institute of Technology {now Munster Technological University, Cork)
 Garda Síochána College
 Institute of Technology Carlow (now South East Technological University, Carlow)
 DCU Dóchas Éireann

Fitzgibbon Cup Champion Colleges

 1911/12 UCD
 1912/13 UCC
 1913/14 UCC
 1914/15 UCD
 1915/16 UCD
 1916/17 UCD
 1917/18 UCC
 1918/19 UCG
 1919/20 UCC 
 1920/21 Not Played 1921/22 UCC
 1922/23 UCD
 1923/24 UCD
 1924/25 UCC
 1925/26 UCG
 1926/27 UCD
 1927/28 UCC
 1928/29 UCC
 1929/30 UCC
 1930/31 UCC
 1931/32 UCD
 1932/33 No Formal WinnerUCD won the tournament; however, UCC was awarded custody of the cup, but was not declared the formal winner, following their successful objection to three players on the UCD winning team - UCC placed a winner's shield on the base of the trophy; Irish Independent, March 14, 1933, p. 14; Connacht Sentinel, March 14, 1933, p. 3
 1933/34 UCD
 1934/35 UCD
 1935/36 UCD
 1936/37 UCD
 1937/38 UCD
 1938/39 UCC
 1939/40 Cup & Medals Not AwardedUCC won the Fitzgibbon Cup, but the Cork County Board declared that three UCC players had played illegally in the competition; the GAA Central Council withheld the Cup and the Winner's medals - no other formal decisions were announced; GAA Central Council Minutes, Meetings of 23 March 1940 & 27 April 1940, GAA/CC/01/07, GAA Museum, cited by Dónal McAnallen; Nenagh Guardian, March 30, 1940, p. 2; Sunday Independent, March 24, 1940, p. 31; Irish Press. February 21, 1941, p. 6
 1940/41 UCD
 1941/42 UCG
 1942/43 Not Played 1943/44 UCD
 1944/45 UCG
 1945/46 UCG
 1946/47 UCC
 1947/48 UCD
 1948/49 UCG
 1949/50 UCD
 1950/51 UCD
 1951/52 UCD
 1952/53 QUB
 1953/54 Null & VoidThe Cup and the Winner's medals were withheld from UCG after an investigation into the legality of the Galway team and the violent scenes at the tournament; the Cup was left in the custody of QUB
 1954/55 UCD
 1955/56 UCC
 1956/57 UCC
 1957/58 UCD
 1958/59 UCC
 1959/60 UCD
 1960/61 UCD
 1961/62 UCC
 1962/63 UCC
 1963/64 UCD
 1964/65 UCD
 1965/66 UCC
 1966/67 UCC
 1967/68 UCD
 1968/69 UCD
 1969/70 UCG
 1970/71 UCC
 1971/72 UCC
 1972/73 SPC Maynooth
 1973/74 SPC Maynooth
 1974/75 UCD
 1975/76 UCC
 1976/77 UCG
 1977/78 UCD
 1978/79 UCD
 1979/80 UCG
 1980/81 UCC
 1981/82 UCC
 1982/83 UCC
 1983/84 UCC
 1984/85 UCC
 1985/86 UCC
 1986/87 UCC
 1987/88 UCC
 1988/89 NIHE Limerick
 1989/90 UCC
 1990/91 UCC
 1991/92 Waterford RTC
 1992/93 UCD
 1993/94 UL
 1994/95 Waterford RTC
 1995/96 UCC
 1996/97 UCC
 1997/98 UCC
 1998/99 Waterford IT
 1999/00 Waterford IT
 2000/01 UCD
 2001/02 UL
 2002/03 Waterford IT
 2003/04 Waterford IT
 2004/05 Limerick IT
 2005/06 Waterford IT
 2006/07 Limerick IT
 2007/08 Waterford IT
 2008/09 UCC
 2009/10 NUI Galway
 2010/11 UL
 2011/12 UCC
 2012/13 UCC
 2013/14 Waterford IT
 2014/15 UL
 2015/16 Mary Immaculate College
 2016/17 Mary Immaculate College
 2017/18 UL
 2018/19 UCC
 2019/20 UCC
 2020/21 No competition
 2021/22 UL
 2022/23 UL
 2023/24
 

Fitzgibbon Shield [Plate] winners
The Fitzgibbon Shield [Plate] competition was introduced in 1976/77 for the teams beaten in the quarter-finals of the Fitzgibbon Cup. As a consequence of the Sigerson Cup shenanigans in February 1990, the 1990/91 Fitzgibbon Cup format was changed to a two-day event to cool the social side of this hurling festival. Thus, the Fitzgibbon Shield matches in 1991/92 and 1992/93 were contested between the losing semi-finalists.

 1976/77 QUB 2-13 TCD 2-6
 1977/78 SPC Maynooth 10-12 NUU† 2-3
 1978/79 QUB 3-10 TCD 3-6 
 1979/80 QUB 1-7 TCD 1-2 
 1980/81 TCD v QUB or NUU
 1981/82 TCD v QUB or SPC Maynooth
 1982/83 QUB 0-7 SPC Maynooth 1-0
 1983/84 QUB 4-8 NUU† 1-6
 1984/85 UU Jordanstown 3-8 SPC Maynooth 2-10
 1985/86 UU Coleraine v SPC Maynooth
 1986/87 SPC Maynooth 1-7 UU Jordanstown 1-5
 1987/88 TCD 1-8 UU Jordanstown 1-2
 1988/89 TCD 2-12 Galway RTC 1-14
 1989/90 UCG 3-10 Cork RTC 3-4
 1990/91 TCD beat UCD
 1991/92 UCC 2-10 UCD 1-12
 1992/93 Waterford RTC 4-13 UL 3-5
 
† New University of Ulster

Captains of winning teams
Unpublished list kindly provided by Dónal McAnallen

Man of the Match/Player of the Tournament and winning team top scorers
The accolade of Man of the Match or Player of the Tournament dates from the 1980s. The "Player of the Tournament", e.g., 1983/84, or "Man of the Match", e.g., 2004/05, was not always from the winning team. Top scorer refers to the player with the highest points tally on the winning side in the final.

Finals listed by year
First win in bold''' type.

References

 
1912 establishments in Ireland
Hurling competitions at Irish universities
Hurling cup competitions